Wild Ones: Native Plants, Natural Landscapes is a non-governmental, not-for-profit 501(c)(3) organization with a mission to promote environmentally sound landscaping practices and preserve biodiversity.

As of November 2021, it has 64 chapters across 23 states in the U.S. to engage in environmental education and advocacy activities.

History
Wild Ones was founded in 1977 by nine people after attending a natural landscaping lecture by Lorrie Otto at the Schlitz Audubon Center.

In 2008, through grant assistance from the Fox River/Green Bay Natural Resource Trustee Council and the Knowles-Nelson Stewardship Fund, Wild Ones established its new headquarters in Neenah, Wisconsin called WILD Center (Wild Ones Institute of Learning and Development).

Publications
A quarterly publication called Wild Ones Journal is available for dues-paying members.

A New Member Handbook for native landscaping is in its 5th edition as of 2010; the 4th edition from 2004 is archived at the EPA.

Programs
Chapter programs include plant rescues, plant sales, garden tours, seed gathering and exchanges, and various outdoor learning projects.

The Lorrie Otto Seeds For Education Grant Program (SFE) provides grants to purchase native seeds and plants and develop outdoor learning centers for youth grades Preschool-12.

References

External links

Ecology organizations
Non-profit organizations based in the United States
Native plant societies based in the United States
Environmental organizations based in Wisconsin